Sporadanthus rivularis is a sedge-like herb in the Restionaceae family, native to Western Australia. It is a dioecious species.

This species was first described by Barbara Briggs and Lawrie Johnson in 2012. The specific epithet, rivularis, derives from Latin and means "of a brook or stream" referring to the species' occurrence near rivers and creeks.

Distribution
It is found in the IBRA Regions of Jarrah Forest, Swan Coastal Plain, and Warren.

References

External links
Sporadanthus rivularis occurrence data from Australasian Virtual Herbarium

Restionaceae
Flora of Western Australia
Plants described in 2012
Taxa named by Barbara G. Briggs
Taxa named by Lawrence Alexander Sidney Johnson